This page details the qualification of the 1978 African Cup of Nations

Preliminary round

|}

Mauritius won 4–3 on aggregate.

First round

|}

Algeria won 5–3 on aggregate.

Nigeria won 3–1 on aggregate.

Ethiopia won 4–2 on aggregate.

Guinea won 5–0 on aggregate.

Senegal won 3–1 on aggregate.

Tunisia won 5–4 on aggregate. 

Congo won 4–2 on aggregate.

Ivory Coast won 5–1 on aggregate, but later were disqualified.

Mali had a walkover to the next round, but later were disqualified.

Uganda had a walkover to the next round.

Zambia had a walkover to the next round.

Second round

|}

Zambia won 6–5 in penalty shootout after 2–2 on aggregate.

Nigeria won 4–3 on aggregate.

Uganda won 2–1 on aggregate.

Both teams were disqualified: Ivory Coast for using an ineligible player in the second leg, and Mali after security forces assaulted the officials at the end of the first leg. Upper Volta, losers to Ivory Coast in the first round, were given a place in the finals.

Congo won 6–5 on aggregate.

Tunisia won 5–3 on aggregate.

Qualified teams
The 8 qualified teams are:

External links
CAN 1978 details - rsssf.com

Qual
Qual
Qual